"Sacred Ground" is a country music song, co-written and originally recorded by American country music singer Kix Brooks, prior to his joining Ronnie Dunn in the duo Brooks & Dunn. Brooks' version was issued in 1989 as a single, and was included on his 1989 self-titled debut album.

A second version was recorded three years later by the American country music band McBride & the Ride. Released in 1992, that version would become the group's highest-charting hit, reaching a peak of #2 on the U.S. Billboard Hot Country Singles & Tracks (now Hot Country Songs) charts.

Content
"Sacred Ground" is a mid-tempo ballad centralizing on a male narrator, who is talking to another man with whom it is implied that his wife had an emotional (and possibly physical) affair. In the first verse, the singer tells of how he married at an early age, and had to work various jobs to sustain his family. In the second chorus, he expresses his intention to reconcile with his wife and asks the other man to not interfere (possibly out of concern that the wife may continue the affair or at least not discourage his continued attention). He defends his relationship with his wife in the chorus: "We were joined in the eyes of the Lord in the eyes of our hometown / Why don't you leave her alone / You're treadin' on sacred ground".

Kix Brooks version
Kix Brooks' version was released in 1989. It was the second and final single from his debut album Kix Brooks, and it reached a peak of 87 on the Billboard Hot Country Singles charts. It was his last solo release before he founded Brooks & Dunn with Ronnie Dunn. Brooks did not chart another solo single until "New to This Town" in 2012.

Chart positions

McBride & the Ride version

Three years after Brooks's version charted, McBride & the Ride recorded its own version of "Sacred Ground." It was released in March 1992 as the lead-off single to the band's second album, also titled Sacred Ground. The song reached a peak of #2 on the Billboard country charts (having been blocked from #1 by Billy Ray Cyrus' debut single "Achy Breaky Heart"), representing the band's highest chart peak.

Music video
The music video was directed by Bill Young and premiered in early 1992.

Chart positions

Year-end charts

References

1989 singles
1992 singles
Kix Brooks songs
McBride & the Ride songs
Songs written by Kix Brooks
Song recordings produced by Tony Brown (record producer)
Capitol Records Nashville singles
MCA Records singles
1989 songs